Antonio de' Tolomei (died 1498) was a Roman Catholic prelate who served as Bishop of Lecce (1485–1498).

Biography
On 18 July 1485, Antonio de' Tolomei was appointed by Pope Innocent VIII as Bishop of Lecce. He served as Bishop of Lecce until his death in 1498.

References

External links and additional sources
 (for Chronology of Bishops) 
 (for Chronology of Bishops) 

15th-century Italian Roman Catholic bishops
1498 deaths
Bishops appointed by Pope Innocent VIII